Thierno Barry (born 21 October 2002), is a French footballer who plays mainly as a forward for Beveren in the Challenger Pro League.

Club career
On 6 July 2022, after a successful test period, Barry was awarded a contract for two seasons in Belgium with Beveren.

References

External links

2002 births
Living people
French footballers
French people of Guinean descent
Association football forwards
S.K. Beveren players
Challenger Pro League players
Expatriate footballers in Belgium